Lancing is an unincorporated community in Morgan County, Tennessee, United States. Lancing has a post office with ZIP code 37770.

Lancing was settled in the 1860s, and was originally known as "Kismet."  In 1879, the Cincinnati Southern Railway constructed a rail line through the area, and named the Kismet rail station "Lancing." The post office applied the name Lancing to the entire community in 1894.  Within a few years of the railroad's arrival, Lancing was home to a store, hotel, two churches, and two saloons.

References

External links

Unincorporated communities in Morgan County, Tennessee
Unincorporated communities in Tennessee